Antonio Joseph (1921- May 7, 2016) was a Haitian artist.

Biography
Born in Barahona, Dominican Republic, to Haitian parents, Joseph practises painting, sculpture, and screen-printing. He worked as a tailor while studying watercolor and sculpture in Haiti and screen-printing in the United States. He joined the Centre d'Art in 1944 and worked with DeWitt Peters. Joseph was twice awarded a fellowship by the Guggenheim Foundation, in 1953 and again in 1957, for his work as a painter. He traveled extensively in 1963, visiting Morocco and much of Europe. In 1972, he joined the administrative council of the Museum of Haitian Art at St. Pierre College in Port-au-Prince. He taught drawing and screen-printing at the Centre d'Art. His works have been exhibited in the United States, Mexico, Jamaica, and Spain.

References
 
 

1921 births
2016 deaths
Haitian painters
Haitian male painters
Haitian sculptors
Haitian expatriates in the Dominican Republic
Haitian expatriates in the United States